Corydalis flexuosa is a species of flowering plant in the genus Corydalis, of the family Papaveraceae. It is a shade-loving perennial originating in woodland and mountainous areas of China. It is summer dormant, meaning that the foliage dies down in summer.

This plant is widely cultivated. It is hardy to USDA zones 5–8. The cultivars 'Blue Panda'  and 'Purple Leaf' have gained the Royal Horticultural Society's Award of Garden Merit.

References 

flexuosa